The Boston Female Anti-Slavery Society (1833–1840) was an abolitionist, interracial organization in Boston, Massachusetts, in the mid-19th century. "During its brief history ... it orchestrated three national women's conventions, organized a multistate petition campaign, sued southerners who brought slaves into Boston, and sponsored elaborate, profitable fundraisers."

Philosophy
The founders believed "slavery to be a direct violation of the laws of God, and productive of a vast amount of misery and crime, and convinced that its abolition can only be effected by an acknowledgement of the justice and necessity of immediate emancipation." The society aimed to "aid and assist in this righteous cause as far as lies within our power. ... Its funds shall be appropriated to the dissemination of truth on the subject of slavery, and the improvement of the moral and intellectual character of the colored population." The group was independent of state and national organizations.

"In their early correspondence with other female antislavery societies, BFASS members admitted that an "astonishing apathy" about slavery and race matters had "prevailed" among them. After concluding that such complacency "cannot be desired," they committed themselves to "sleep no more" now that the "long, dark night is rapidly receding, the light of truth has unsealed our eyes, and fallen upon our hearts, [and] awakened our slumbering energies." ... The establishment of BFASS marks a dramatic upsurge in women's activity within Boston's abolitionist movement."

History
On October 21, 1835, the Society announced that British abolitionist George Thompson would be speaking. Pro-slavery forces posted nearly 500 notices of a $100 reward for the citizen that would first lay violent hands on him. Thompson canceled at the last minute, and Wm. Lloyd Garrison, editor and publisher of the abolitionist newspaper The Liberator, was quickly scheduled to speak in his place. A lynch mob formed, forcing Garrison to escape through the back of the hall and hide in a carpenter's shop. The mob soon found him, putting a noose around his neck to drag him away. Several strong men, including the mayor Theodore Lyman II, intervened and took him to the most secure place in Boston, the Leverett Street Jail.

In 1836 the Society joined with other groups in suing for habeas corpus in the "freedom suit" known as Commonwealth v. Aves.  They sought freedom for the young slave girl Med, whose mistress had brought her to Boston from New Orleans on a trip. The court decided in favor of the slave's freedom and made Med a ward of the court.  The decision caused an uproar in the South and added to tensions over slaveholders' travel to free states, as well as the hardening of positions in the years leading up to the Civil War.  It was the first case in which a slave was determined to be free soon after being brought voluntarily to a free state. That same year, the Society was involved in the Abolition Riot of 1836.

In 1837, leaders of the society included Lucy M. Ball, Martha Violet Ball, Mary G. Chapman, Eunice Davis, Mary S. Parker, Sophia Robinson, Henrietta Sargent, and her sister Catherine Sargent. Southwick, Catherine M. Sullivan, Anne Warren Weston, Caroline Weston, and Maria Weston Chapman. Other affiliates of the society included Mary Grew, Joshua V. Himes, Francis Jackson, Maria White Lowell, Harriet Martineau, Abby Southwick, Baron Stow, Mrs. George Thompson.

The society held a number of anti-slavery fairs in which women could embroider or sew articles with anti-slavery mottoes on them, and then sell them to attendees to fund raise for their group. The Boston Fair was the largest one, but it inspired smaller fairs for the other female antislavery groups as well. Including the Fall River Female Anti-Slavery Society, which not only attended the Boston fair with their products to sell, but there is reports of them selling their articles in Fall River as well. This was used to fund raise for their group too.

Delegates from the Boston Female Anti-Slavery Society also attended the Anti-Slavery Convention of American Women, which included delegates from various female lead anti slavery groups around the country to discuss the rights of African-American women. They had a system in which they would choose leads for the convention and more than once Mary S. Parker from the Boston group was chosen as president. An African-American women who was also a member, Martha V. Ball was also chosen as one of the secretaries.

Division and dissolution
Infighting and factionalism characterized the society after a few years. "Within 7 short years, BFASS had risen to national prominence, only to dissolve amid confusion, acrimony, and ... bitterness."

See also
 The Liberty Bell (annual)

References

Further reading
 Report of the Boston Female Anti Slavery Society, 1836.
 Annual report of the Boston Female Anti-Slavery Society, Boston: Isaac Knapp, 1837.
 Lee V. Chambers, The Weston Sisters: An American Abolitionist Family. Chapel Hill, NC: University of North Carolina Press, 2014. 
 Maria Weston Chapman, Right and wrong in Massachusetts, Boston : Dow & Jackson’s Anti-slavery Press, 1839. Relates to dissensions in the Massachusetts anti-slavery society, 1837–1839.
 Harriet Martineau. Review of "Right and wrong in Boston in 1835–37": the annual reports of the Boston female anti-slavery society. Originally published in the London and Westminster Review, reprinted in The Martyr Age of the United States, Boston: Weeks, Jordan & Co., 1839.
 Debra Gold Hansen, Strained Sisterhood: Gender and Class in the Boston Female Anti-Slavery Society, Amherst: University of Massachusetts Press, 1993. 
 Debra Gold Hansen, "The Boston Female Anti-Slavery Society and the Limits of Gender Politics." in Abolitionist Sisterhood: Women’s Political Culture in Antebellum America, editors, Jean Fagan Yellin and John C. Van Horne, Ithaca: Cornell U. Press, 1994, pp. 45–66.
 Constance W. Hassett. "Siblings and Antislavery: The Literary and Political Relations of Harriet Martineau, James Martineau, and Maria Weston Chapman", Signs, Vol. 21, No. 2 (Winter, 1996), pp. 374–409.

External links
  Boston Female Anti-Slavery Society Constitution (1835), Society for the Study of American Women Writers, Lehigh University
 American Abolitionists and Antislavery Activists, comprehensive list of abolitionist and anti-slavery activists and organizations in the United States, including the Boston Female Anti-Slavery Society. Website includes historic biographies and anti-slavery timelines, bibliographies, etc.

1833 establishments in Massachusetts
1840 disestablishments in Massachusetts
Organizations established in 1833
Organizations disestablished in 1840
19th century in Boston
American abolitionist organizations
Freedom suits in the United States
History of women in Massachusetts
Organizations based in Boston
1830s in the United States
African-American history in Boston
Women in Boston